Alexander K. Kummant (born 1962) was named by Amtrak on August 29, 2006, as the railroad company's new president and chief executive officer effective September 12 of that year.  He succeeded David L. Gunn in this position who was dismissed in November 2005, and David Hughes who had been serving as interim president.
Kummant submitted his resignation from Amtrak on November 14, 2008.  He graduated from Case Western Reserve University's engineering school in 1982.

Before working for Amtrak, Kummant had worked as an executive for Union Pacific Railroad (UP) where he fulfilled several Vice President roles.  After UP, Kummant also served as Executive Vice President and Chief Marketing Officer of Komatsu America Corporation.  Before that, he was president of BOMAG, the German manufacturer of road rollers and other construction material compacting equipment.

As Amtrak president and CEO, Kummant was more conciliatory towards the survival of Amtrak in its current form than Congressional Republicans had been during the early 2000s. During his term, he did not support Congressional proposals to split the Northeast Corridor (the segment from Boston to Richmond) from the rest of Amtrak's operations; nor did he envision shedding the long distance east-west routes of Amtrak.

Kummant submitted his resignation on November 14, 2008.  Upon his resignation, Amtrak COO William Crosbie assumed the role of interim CEO, but was succeeded on November 25 by former FRA administrator Joseph H. Boardman.

Don Phillips claims that inside sources indicate that Kummant did not in fact resign voluntarily, but was made to quit because of a dispute with the board of directors about debt restructuring.

In October 2012, Kummant was recruited by QR National in Australia, becoming Executive Vice President Strategy.

See also
Amtrak

References 

1942 births
Living people
Amtrak presidents
21st-century American railroad executives